The Bermuda Olympic Association (IOC code: BER) is the National Olympic Committee representing Bermuda. The committee is also the Commonwealth Games Association representing the island nation.

History
Bermuda Olympic Association was founded in 1968 and recognised by the International Olympic Committee in the same year.

See also 
Bermuda at the Olympics
Bermuda at the Commonwealth Games

References

External links 
 Official website
Bermuda Olympic Association

Bermuda
Bermuda
Oly
Bermuda at the Olympics
Sports organizations established in 1968